Frank James Lamanske (September 30, 1906 – August 4, 1971), nicknamed "Lefty", was a pitcher in Major League Baseball, who appeared in two games for the 1935 Brooklyn Dodgers, working 3 innings and allowing five hits and three runs.

References

External links

1906 births
1971 deaths
People from Oglesby, Illinois
Baseball players from Illinois
Major League Baseball pitchers
Brooklyn Dodgers players
Seattle Indians players
Denver Bears players
Davenport Blue Sox players
Reading Brooks players
Allentown Brooks players
Mission Reds players
San Francisco Seals (baseball) players
Oklahoma City Indians players
Knoxville Smokies players
St. Paul Saints (AA) players
Dallas Rebels players
Fort Worth Cats players
Boise Pilots players
San Diego Padres (minor league) players
Twin Falls Cowboys players